The 2021 East Tennessee State Buccaneers football team represented East Tennessee State University in the 2021 NCAA Division I FCS football season as a member of the Southern Conference (SoCon). The Buccaneers were led by fourth-year head coach Randy Sanders and played their home games at William B. Greene Jr. Stadium in Johnson City, Tennessee. On November 20, 2021, the Buccaneers defeated SoCon rival Mercer, clinching the Southern Conference championship. The Buccaneers also finished their regular season with an overall record of 10–1, making only the third time in program history to have won 10 games. They also beat FBS Vanderbilt in a 23-3 blowout win.

Schedule

References

East Tennessee State
East Tennessee State Buccaneers football seasons
Southern Conference football champion seasons
2021 NCAA Division I FCS playoff participants
East Tennessee State Buccaneers football